Sean Mac Feorais, aka John de Bermingham, aka John Winfield was Archbishop of Tuam during 1430 to 1437.

Mac Feorais was a member of the de Bermingham family, Baron Athenry. Mac Feorais was the Gaelic form of their surname, and by Archbishop's lifetime, had become deeply Gaelicised. He was possibly a younger brother of Walter de Bermingham, Lord Athenry, who died 1428.

He was appointed 7 June and consecrated after 5 December 1430. The See had been vacant since 1411.

The History of the Popes has no information on him, instead quoting from the Annals of the Four Masters:

"The Archbishop of Connaught (Tuam), of the Bermingham family, died." Quaere, to whom does this allude?

References

External links
 http://www.ucc.ie/celt/published/T100005B/
 http://www.ucc.ie/celt/published/T100005C/
 https://archive.org/stream/fastiecclesiaehi04cottuoft#page/n17/mode/2up

Archbishops of Tuam
People from County Galway
15th-century Roman Catholic archbishops in Ireland